Saint-Laurent-d'Oingt (literally Saint-Laurent of Oingt) is a former commune in the Rhône department of the Auvergne-Rhône-Alpes region in eastern France. On 1 January 2017, Le Bois-d'Oingt, Oingt and Saint-Laurent-d'Oingt merged becoming one commune of Val d'Oingt.

See also
Communes of the Rhône department

References

Former communes of Rhône (department)